Ageratum yellow vein virus is a plant pathogenic virus of the family Geminiviridae.

In 2007 a unique strain was found on Guam.

See also
Soybean mosaic virus, a virus sometimes referred to as Crinkle.

References

External links
ICTVdB - The Universal Virus Database: Soybean crinkle leaf virus
Family Groups - The Baltimore Method

Begomovirus
Viral plant pathogens and diseases
Soybean diseases